This article lists songs about Boston, Massachusetts, including those set there, named after a location or feature of the city, or about a notable figure associated with the city.
It is not intended to include songs where Boston is simply "name-checked" along with various other cities.

"All Kindsa Girls" by Real Kids
"An Open Letter to Boston" by Mark Lind & The Unloved
"As We Walk to Fenway Park in Boston Town" by Jonathan Richman
"Back Bay Shuffle" by Artie Shaw
"Back to Boston" by The Rosebuds
"Bank of Boston Beauty Queen" by The Dresden Dolls
"Beantown" by John Cena
"Bigger Things in Mind" by Westbound Train
"Bill Lee" (Boston Red Sox pitcher, 1969–1978) by Warren Zevon
"Blue Thunder" by Galaxie 500
"Billy Ruane" by Varsity Drag (Ben Deily)
"Boston" by Augustana
"Boston" by Ed OG
"Boston" by The Byrds
"Boston" by The Dresden Dolls
"Boston" by emmet swimming
"Boston" by Kenny Chesney
"Boston" by Paulson
"Boston" by Patty Griffin
"Boston (Ladies of Cambridge)" by Vampire Weekend
"Boston and St. John's" by Great Big Sea
"Boston Asphalt" by the Dropkick Murphys
"Boston Babies" by G.B.H.
"Boston Babies" by Slaughter & The Dogs
"Boston Band" by Jim's Big Ego
"Boston Belongs To Me" by Death Before Dishonor
"The Boston Beguine" by Sheldon Harnick
"Boston Jail" by Porter Wagoner
"A Boston Peace" by Say Anything
"Boston Rag" by Steely Dan
"Boston Rose" by Liam Reilly
"Boston Tea Party" by Alex Harvey (and, more recently, by Fish)
"The Boston Tea Party" by Jimmy Dorsey,(Decca, DLA-456-A)
"Boston United" by The Unseen
"Boston, USA" by The Ducky Boys
"Bostons" by Have Heart
"Bridges, Squares" by Ted Leo and the Pharmacists
"Bunker Hill" by Michael Penn
"Carl Yastrzemski" by Jess Cain
"The Chosen Few" by the Dropkick Murphys
"Christmas Time" by the Dogmatics (takes place in Kenmore Square)
"Crutch" by Buffalo Tom
"Devils in Boston" by Samantha Crain
"Dirty Water" by The Standells
"The End of Radio" by Shellac
"Etoh" by The Avalanches
"Fairmount Hill" by the Dropkick Murphys
"Feelin' Massachusetts" by The Juliana Hatfield Three
"The Fenway" by Jonathan Richman (Jonathan Richman and the Modern Lovers)
"Fly Into the Mystery" by Jonathan Richman (The Modern Lovers)
"For Boston" originally by T.J. Hurley (and, more recently, by the Dropkick Murphys)
"For Boston" by The Hold Steady
"Girlfriend" by Jonathan Richman (The Modern Lovers)
"Going to Boston" (also "Goodbye Girls, I'm Going to Boston"), traditional folksong
"Going Out in Style" by the Dropkick Murphys
"Government Center" by Jonathan Richman (The Modern Lovers)
"Homecoming King" by Guster
"I Want My City Back" by The Mighty Mighty Bosstones
"The Ice of Boston" by The Dismemberment Plan
"I'm Shipping up to Boston" by Woody Guthrie and the Dropkick Murphys from The Warrior's Code 2005, music video filmed in East Boston, (Celtic punk)
"I'm Yours Boston" by Big D and the Kids Table
"In Defense of Dorchester" by the Street Dogs
"Just Like Larry" by Dispatch (subject of the song is former Boston Celtic and Basketball Hall of Famer Larry Bird)
"Knights of Bostonia" by State Radio
"Land of the Glass Pinecones" by Human Sexual Response
"Logan to Government Center" by Brand New
"Lost in Boston" by The Walkmen
"M.T.A." by The Kingston Trio
"Mass Ave" by Tanya Donelly
"Mass Ave" by Willie Alexander
"Mass Pike" by The Get Up Kids
"Massachusetts Avenue" by Amanda Palmer & The Grand Theft Orchestra
"Mess" by Noah Kahan
"Midnight Rambler" by The Rolling Stones
"Modern World" by Jonathan Richman (The Modern Lovers)
"A More Perfect Union" by Titus Andronicus
"My Boston" by Big Shug
"My Sister" by Juliana Hatfield
"Never Alone" by Dropkick Murphys
"No Future (Death or Jail)" by Mark Lind
"Normal Town" by Better Than Ezra
"Pipe Bomb on Lansdowne Street" by the Dropkick Murphys
"Please Come to Boston" by Dave Loggins
"The Rascal King" by The Mighty Mighty Bosstones
"Ride on Down the Highway" by Jonathan Richman (The Modern Lovers)
"Riot on Broad Street" by The Mighty Mighty Bosstones
"Roadrunner" by Jonathan Richman (The Modern Lovers)
"Rock and Roll Band" by Boston
"Roslindale" by Birdbrain
"Savin Hill" by Street Dogs
"She's From Boston" by Kenny Chesney
"She's Got a Boyfriend Now" by Boys Like Girls
"Shining On" by Big D and the Kids Table
"Shot Heard 'Round the World" by Ween (originally from Schoolhouse Rock)
"Skinhead on the MBTA" by the Dropkick Murphys
"Southeast of Boston" by June of 44
"South End Incident" by The Beacon Street Union
"The State of Massachusetts" by Dropkick Murphys
"Steady Riot" by Big D and the Kids Table
"Subway" by Mary Lou Lord
"Sweet Baby James" by James Taylor
"T DJ" by Freezepop
"Tessie" by Dropkick Murphys
"There's A Black Hole in the Shadow of The Pru" by American Nightmare
"They Came To Boston" by The Mighty Mighty Bosstones
"This Is Boston, Not L.A." by The Freeze
"The Warrior's Code" by Dropkick Murphys (subject of the song is boxer Micky Ward)
"Time To Go" by Dropkick Murphys
"Twilight in Boston" by Jonathan Richman
 "Two Soldiers" by Bob Dylan
"Walkaways" by Counting Crows
"Walk Up the Street" by Jonathan Richman (The Modern Lovers)
"Whoever's in New England" by Reba McEntire
"Why Do I" by Will Dailey
"Wicked Little Critta" by They Might Be Giants
"Winter Afternoon by B.U. in Boston" by Jonathan Richman
"Young New England" by Transit

References

External links

Boston
Songs about Boston
Songs